The women's 49 kilograms competition at the 2018 World Weightlifting Championships was held on 2–3 November 2018.

Schedule

Medalists

Records

Results

New records

References

External links
Results 
Results Group A
Results Group B
Results Group C

Women's 49 kg
2018 in women's weightlifting